Predrag Bogosavljev (born June 27, 1959) is a Serbian basketball executive and former player.

Playing career 
Bogosavljev played for the Crvena zvezda of the Yugoslav First League from 1976–1989. He is ranked 2nd for most games played (423), behind Slobodan Nikolić, and 7th for the most points scored (4,350) in the history of Crvena zvezda. He also played for the OKK Beograd with whom he won the Yugoslav Cup in 1993.

National team career 
Bogosavljev was a member of the Yugoslavia national junior team that won the gold medal at the 1976 European Championship for Juniors in Spain. Over seven tournament games, he averaged 8 points per game. Also, he won the bronze medal at the 1978 European Championship for Juniors in Italy where he averaged 13.8 points per game.

Post-playing career 
Bogosavljev was long-time secretary-general of the Basketball Federation of Yugoslavia and the Basketball Federation of Serbia and Montenegro. Later, he became the Sport and Competitions Director of FIBA.

Personal life 
Bogosavljev earned his bachelor's degree in mechanical engineering from the University of Belgrade in 1984.

See also 
 List of KK Crvena zvezda players with 100 games played
 KK Crvena zvezda accomplishments and records

References

1959 births
Living people
KK Crvena zvezda players
KK Rabotnički players
OKK Beograd players
Basketball players from Belgrade
Serbian expatriate basketball people in North Macedonia
Serbian expatriate basketball people in Switzerland
Serbian men's basketball players
Serbian basketball executives and administrators
University of Belgrade Faculty of Mechanical Engineering alumni
Vevey Riviera Basket players
Yugoslav men's basketball players
Centers (basketball)
Sportspeople from Kikinda
Power forwards (basketball)